Arjang may refer to:
Årjäng Municipality, Sweden
Arjang, Iran (disambiguation)